Bikshikovo (Bikşik; , Pekšek) is a rural locality (a village) in Kayrakovsky Selsoviet, Mishkinsky District, Bashkortostan, Russia. The population was 277 as of 2010. There are 5 streets.

Geography 
Bikshikovo is located 21 km west of Mishkino (the district's administrative centre) by road. Chebykovo is the nearest rural locality.

References 

Rural localities in Mishkinsky District